John Francis Wade (1 January 1711 – 16 August 1786) was an English hymnist who is sometimes credited with writing and composing the hymn "Adeste Fideles" (which was translated to "O Come All Ye Faithful" in 1841 by Frederick Oakeley), even though the actual authorship of the hymn remains uncertain. The earliest copies of the hymn all bear his signature.

Wade fled to France after the Jacobite rising of 1745 was crushed. As a Catholic layman, he lived with exiled English Catholics in France, where he taught music and worked on church music for private use.

Jacobite symbolism
Bennett Zon, Head of the Department of Music at Durham University, has noted that Wade's Roman Catholic liturgical books were often decorated with Jacobite floral imagery. He argued that the texts had coded Jacobite meanings. He describes the hymn "Adeste Fideles" as a birth ode to Bonnie Prince Charlie, replete with secret references decipherable by the "faithful": the followers of the Pretender, James Francis Edward Stuart.

References

External links
 
 

 Biography and works at the Cyber Hymnal

1711 births
1786 deaths
English hymnwriters
English Roman Catholics
18th-century English people